Per Henrik Nils Sjöbring (9 July 1879 – 19 February 1956) was a Swedish physician and professor of psychiatry.

Sjöbring was born in Aringsås, Sweden. He received his doctorate in 1913 at Uppsala University and was a professor of psychiatry at the University of Lund 1930–1944. He has become best known for his variables for description of personality types. His so-called constitution factors (known as Sjöbring's theory of constitution) are called:

 capacity (intelligence)
 validity (psychic energy)
 stability (balance in keynote)
 solidity (firmness, tardiness, tenacity)

By means of these variables, all people can be categorized as either normal, super- or sub-; for instance subcapable (unintelligent), subvalid (lack of psychic energy), normosolid, superstable, and so on.

See also
Subsolid personality

Bibliography
Personality Structure and Development: A Model and its Application, Copenhagen, 1973 (Swedish original 1958).

References

1879 births
1956 deaths
Swedish psychiatrists
People connected to Lund University
Uppsala University alumni
People from Alvesta Municipality